Maskelynes, or Kuliviu (Uliveo), is an Oceanic language spoken on the Maskelyne Islands off south Malekula, Vanuatu.

Phonology

Consonants

  are in free variation as unreleased  or unvoiced  word-finally or before a consonant
  is also in free variation as nasal  word-finally, especially among young speakers
  is realized as a voiceless  among some speakers, especially young
  are unreleased  word-finally or before a consonant (though  has never been recorded before a consonant)
  lose their labialization word-finally when not followed by a vowel and before 
  is in free variation as trilled  (tapped  in Peskarus) before  and sometimes before 
  is  before voiced consonants
  are [] before voiceless consonants and word-finally
  are vocalic  when in nucleus following

Vowels

  is near-close  between front consonants
  is close-mid  word-finally
  is  after labiovelarized consonants or before 
  are realised as single morphemes, 
  is realised as front  between front consonants, and near-close  when proceeded or preceded by back consonants
  is front  between front consonants

Voiceless vowel
A voiceless  occurs at the ends of words.

Phonotactics
Possible syllable structures in Maskelynes: (C/S)V(S)(C)

Letter-to-phoneme correspondence

Grammar

Verbs
The verbs of Maskelynes are agglutinative, mostly being modified by prefixes, though the stem of a verb can stand on its own. These prefixes encode for, in order of appearance in verb: 1. tense-aspect-modes; 2. subject, person and number; 3. various modes, including realis and irrealis; 4. two tense-modes; 5. reduplication. The object of a sentence is encoded by a suffix. 

Examples of verbal agglutination:

Reduplication
Reduplication in Maskelynes has various usages, and can encode for e.g. plurality, habituality, iterative aspect, etc.

External links
 Resources in and about the Maskelynes language at OLAC
 Paradisec has a number of collections that include Maskelynes language materials
 Maskelynes (Kuliviu) at Omniglot

References

Bibliography

 

Malekula languages
Languages of Vanuatu